Messerschmitt P.1108 Fernbomber was a design for a jet-propelled bomber developed for the Luftwaffe by Messerschmitt during the last years of Nazi Germany. It was never completed.

History
The P.1108 was designed by Dr. Wurster, to a concept by Dr. Alexander Lippisch. It was to have four Heinkel HeS 011 jet engines placed in the wing near the trailing edge, with intakes under the leading edge and ducting through it.

While not a true flying wing, it was tailless (with only a stabilizing fin and rudder).

While the Fedden Mission was told about the project, none of the information provided by Messerschmitt's employees could be independently verified, since all data had already been removed by the French. No aircraft were completed.

Notes

Sources
 Christopher, John.  The Race for Hitler's X-Planes.  The Mill, Gloucestershire:  History Press, 2013.

Abandoned military aircraft projects of Germany
1940s German bomber aircraft
P1108
World War II jet aircraft of Germany